Ludovico Tersigni (born 8 August 1995) is an Italian actor and television host.

Biography 
Tersigni was born in Rome and grew up in Nettuno; he graduated from the Chris Cappell College of Anzio.

In 2014, he made his acting debut in the film Arance & martello, directed by his uncle Diego Bianchi, which was presented at the 71st Venice International Film Festival.
Two years later he starred in the role of Ale in Summertime, directed by Gabriele Muccino; since 2015 he has been part of the main cast of the Italian series Tutto può succedere, playing the role of Stefano Privitera.

In 2016, he was chosen to play Samuele, the main character of the film Slam, presented at the Turin Film Festival and then distributed in cinemas the following year. For his role, he learned skateboarding, thus making himself some of the tricks in the film.

In 2018, he made his breakthrough with the role of Giovanni Garau in the webseries Skam Italia. He was then cast as the male lead of the Italian Netflix production Summertime (2020–2022).

On 20 May 2021, he was announced as the new host of the fifteenth season of X Factor, replacing Alessandro Cattelan. Since his hosting was poorly received by the public, he was not confirmed for the sixteenth season and replaced by Francesca Michielin.

Awards and nominations 
 2017 – Guglielmo Biraghi Award for Slam at Nastri d'argento

Filmography

Films

Television

Television programs 

 X Factor (Sky Uno and TV8, 2021)
 Drag Race Italia (Discovery+ (Italy) and WOW Presents Plus, 2022)

References

External links 
 
ludovico tersigni biography

Living people
1995 births
21st-century Italian male musicians
21st-century Italian male actors
Male actors from Rome
Mass media people from Rome